Indication may refer to:

 A synonym for sign
 Human interface, highlighting the single object pointed to as a cursor is moved, without any other user action such as clicking, is indication
 Indication (medicine). A valid reason to use a certain test, medication, procedure, or surgery.